Gavin Gordon (born 28 February 1978) is an Irish former professional rugby league footballer who played in the 1990s and 2000s.

International honours
Gavin Gordon won six caps for Ireland between  1995 and 2001.

Gordon was threatened with being banned from rugby union by his school if he played in the 1995 Rugby League Emerging Nations Tournament, but this threat was eventually withdrawn. He became the youngest ever rugby league international, aged 17 years and 229 days old, when he debuted for Ireland against Moldova at Spotland Stadium, Rochdale on Monday 16 October 1995.

References

1978 births
Living people
Expatriate rugby league players in England
Irish expatriate rugby league players
Irish expatriate sportspeople in England
Irish rugby league players
Irish rugby union players
Place of birth missing (living people)
Rugby league fullbacks
Rugby league players from County Down
Chorley Lynx players
London Skolars players
Ireland national rugby league team players